Allenhurst is an Unincorporated community in Matagorda County, Texas, United States.

Education
Van Vleck Independent School District operates schools in the area.

The designated community college for Van Vleck ISD is Wharton County Junior College.

References

External links

Unincorporated communities in Matagorda County, Texas
Unincorporated communities in Texas